The 2020 Pro Bowl was the National Football League's all-star game for the 2019 NFL season. It was played on January 26, 2020, at Camping World Stadium in Orlando, Florida, and was televised nationally by ESPN, while being simulcast on ABC and Disney XD.

Fan voting began on November 12, 2019, and ended on December 12, 2019. The initial roster was released on December 17, 2019. The Baltimore Ravens tied an NFL record (set by the 2007 Dallas Cowboys) by having 13 players selected to the game. The coaching staff for the AFC was led by John Harbaugh of the Baltimore Ravens, and for the NFC by Pete Carroll of the Seattle Seahawks. The AFC won the game, 38–33.

This was the first occasion since the 1995 season that the New Orleans Giants had no player make the Pro Bowl.

Background
The NFL's three-year contract with Camping World Stadium in Orlando, Florida, expired after the 2019 game. The league explored alternative sites, including hosting the game in Miami a week after the Super Bowl. In August 2019, the NFL decided to keep the game in Orlando for an additional year.

Rule changes
As in previous years, some rules for the Pro Bowl were different from the regular season. Some of the rules used in this game were:
 After a score, there was no kickoff, as in previous years' Pro Bowls. The scoring team had two options:
 Give the opposing team the ball at the opposing team's own 25-yard line (equivalent to a touchback), or
 Run one play from the scoring team's 25-yard line, in lieu of an onside kick. If the scoring team gains at least 15 yards it retains possession and is awarded a first down; otherwise, the other team takes over at the dead ball spot. In essence, it is a 4th-and-15 play from a team's own 25-yard line.
The "onside kick" option was exercised by the NFC in the 4th quarter, resulting in QB Kirk Cousins throwing an interception to Earl Thomas.
 False start penalties on receivers flexed to the line of scrimmage were relaxed. A receiver could flinch or lift one foot off the ground without penalty.

Summary

Box score

Statistics

Starting lineups

AFC roster
The following players were selected as the AFC Pro Bowl Team:

Offense

Defense

Special teams

NFC roster
The following players were selected as the NFC Pro Bowl Team:

Offense

Defense

Special teams

Notes:
Players must have accepted their invitations as alternates to be listed; those who declined are not considered Pro Bowlers.

bold player who participated in game
 signifies the player has been selected as a captain
 Replacement player selection due to injury or vacancy
 Injured/suspended player; selected but did not participate
 Replacement starter; selected as reserve
 Selected but did not play because his team advanced to Super Bowl LIV (see Pro Bowl "Player Selection" section)
 Selected but chose not to participate
 Selected as starter, but relinquished that role

Number of selections per team

Broadcasting
The game was televised nationally by ESPN, while being simulcast on ABC and Disney XD, and in Spanish by ESPN Deportes.

Early in the first quarter, an ABC News special report (simulcast on ESPN, with Disney XD continuing on with game coverage) interrupted the game to announce the death of NBA legend Kobe Bryant in a helicopter crash earlier in the day; before the game, NFC players who learned of his death conducted a prayer led by Wilson, while various on-field tributes were made during the game. With coverage of Bryant's death becoming a certain and continuing theme of the game coverage, it was decided to end the Disney XD simulcast with nine minutes remaining in the second quarter and switch that network to an impromptu marathon of Big City Greens.

References

External links
Official website

2020
2019 National Football League season
2020 in American football
Pro Bowl
American football in Orlando, Florida
Sports competitions in Orlando, Florida
2020 in sports in Florida
2020s in Orlando, Florida